The Northern Iowan is the newspaper of The University of Northern Iowa. It is published semi-weekly, on Monday and Thursday and distributed around campus free of charge.<ref>"The Northern Iowan- Information at a Glance". The Northern Iowan YouTube channel, 3/27/2010.</ref> The paper publishes articles on campus news and events, the university's sports programs, and student opinion pieces. The name of the paper has changed over the years. It was called the Students Offering from 1888–1889, the Normal Eye from 1892–1911, the College Eye from 1911–1967, and the Northern Iowan'' from 1967–present.

In 1967 the newspaper was at the center of a public furor over the newspaper's publication of an article by a young English professor, Edward Hoffmans, criticizing the draft and advocating an end to the Vietnam War.

In 2022, the student newspaper celebrated its 130th anniversary. The Northern Iowan has made adjustments to its operations in response to the growing digital landscape, including financial cuts. However, it has remained committed to informing students and readers about events in the community and holding institutions accountable. The paper's history demonstrates the importance of student journalism and its ability to serve the public and create the historic record of the times.

Honors
First class honors from the National Scholastic Press Association in 1932.
All-American honors from the National Scholastic Press Association in 1933.
Best all-around paper and first in front-page makeup for six columns and over at the 17th annual convention of the Iowa College Press Association in 1933.
All-state college newspaper and first in front-page makeup for six columns and over at the annual convention of the Iowa College Press Association in 1936.
Best all-around newspaper and first in front-page makeup for six columns and over at the annual convention of the Iowa College Press Association in 1937.
All-American honors from the National Scholastic Press Association (which then became the Associated Collegiate Press) from 1937-1949.
5 star All-American Honor by the Associated Collegiate Press for spring 1982 issues

References 

University of Northern Iowa
Student newspapers published in Iowa